The Velaunii or Velauni (Gaulish: *Uelaunoi) were a Gallic tribe dwelling in the western Alps during the Iron Age.

Name 
They are mentioned as Velauni by Pliny (1st c. AD), and probably as Οὐελαυνίους on an inscription.

The ethnonym Velaunī is a latinized form of Gaulish *Uelaunoi (sing. *Uelaunos). It may mean the 'chiefs, commandants', or else be derived from the Indo-European root *wel- ('to see') attached to the suffix -auni (< *āmn-ī), also found in Ingauni and Ligauni.

Geography 
The Velaunii dwelled in the western Alps, possibly in the valley of the Estéron, a tributary of the Var. Their chief town may have been Brigantio (modern Briançonnet). Although no pre-Roman occupation has been found in archaeological records, the development of the Roman city suggests the presence of preexisting communities in the valley of the Estéron.

History 
They are mentioned by Pliny the Elder as one of the Alpine tribes conquered by Rome in 16–15 BC, and whose name was engraved on the Tropaeum Alpium.

A treaty of hospitality with a Greek city, possibly Massalia, was recorded by an inscription on a bronze hand dated to the 2nd–1st century BC. According to Guy Barruol, it may have been a laissez-passer for Greek caravan merchants on the Velaunian territory.

References

Primary sources

Bibliography 

Historical Celtic peoples
Gauls
Tribes of pre-Roman Gaul